Puddle is a hamlet near Lanlivery in mid Cornwall, England, United Kingdom.

References

Hamlets in Cornwall